Fabio Albinelli (born 21 August 1961) is a former Italian footballer. He played as defender.

References

1961 births
Living people
Sportspeople from Modena
Italian footballers
Association football defenders
Serie A players
Bologna F.C. 1909 players
A.C. Cesena players
U.S. Alessandria Calcio 1912 players
Parma Calcio 1913 players
A.C. Carpi players
Footballers from Emilia-Romagna